In astronomy, the spectral index of a source is a measure of the dependence of radiative flux density (that is, radiative flux per unit of frequency) on frequency. Given frequency  and radiative flux density , the spectral index  is given implicitly by

Note that if flux does not follow a power law in frequency, the spectral index itself is a function of frequency. Rearranging the above, we see that the spectral index is given by

Clearly the power law can only apply over a certain range of frequency because otherwise the integral over all frequencies would be infinite.

Spectral index is also sometimes defined in terms of wavelength . In this case, the spectral index  is given implicitly by

and at a given frequency, spectral index may be calculated by taking the derivative

which implies that

The opposite sign convention is sometimes employed, in which the spectral index is given by

The spectral index of a source can hint at its properties. For example, using the positive sign convention, the spectral index of the emission from an optically thin thermal plasma is -0.1, whereas for an optically thick plasma it is 2. Therefore, a spectral index of -0.1 to 2 at radio frequencies often indicates thermal emission, while a steep negative spectral index typically indicates synchrotron emission. It is worth noting that the observed emission can be affected by several absorption processes that affect the low-frequency emission the most; the reduction in the observed emission at low frequencies might result in a positive spectral index even if the intrinsic emission has a negative index. Therefore, it is not straightforward to associate positive spectral indices with thermal emission.

Spectral index of thermal emission
At radio frequencies (i.e. in the low-frequency, long-wavelength limit), where the Rayleigh–Jeans law is a good approximation to the spectrum of thermal radiation, intensity is given by

Taking the logarithm of each side and taking the partial derivative with respect to  yields

Using the positive sign convention, the spectral index of thermal radiation is thus  in the Rayleigh–Jeans regime. The spectral index departs from this value at shorter wavelengths, for which the Rayleigh–Jeans law becomes an increasingly inaccurate approximation, tending towards zero as intensity reaches a peak at a frequency given by Wien's displacement law. Because of the simple temperature-dependence of radiative flux in the Rayleigh–Jeans regime, the radio spectral index is defined implicitly by

References

Radio astronomy
Equations of astronomy